Stenoptilia jacutica is a moth of the family Pterophoridae. It is found in Yakutia, Russia.

References

Moths described in 1996
jacutica
Moths of Asia